Al-Ruhaybah or Al-Ruhaibah is a Syrian city in the Al-Qutayfah District of the Rif Dimashq Governorate. According to the Syria Central Bureau of Statistics (CBS), Ar-Ruhaybah had a population of 30,450 in the 2004 census. Its inhabitants are predominantly Sunni Muslims.

References

Bibliography

Populated places in Al-Qutayfah District
Cities in Syria